Cock Fight may refer to:

Cockfight
The Cock Fight, 1846 painting by Gérôme